Lapy is a political party in Venezuela. At the 2000 Venezuelan parliamentary election, the party won 3 out of 165 seats  in the National Assembly of Venezuela.

Political parties in Venezuela